G. graveolens may refer to:
 Gautieria graveolens, a fungus species
 Globifomes graveolens, a fungus species

See also